In mathematics, the -function, typically denoted K(z),    is a generalization of the hyperfactorial to complex numbers, similar to the generalization of the factorial to the gamma function.

Definition 

Formally, the -function is defined as

It can also be given in closed form as

where  denotes the derivative of the Riemann zeta function,  denotes the Hurwitz zeta function and

Another expression using the polygamma function is

Or using the balanced generalization of the polygamma function:

where  is the Glaisher constant.

Similar to the Bohr-Mollerup Theorem for the Gamma function, the log K-function is the unique (up to an additive constant) eventually 2-convex solution to the equation  where  is the forward difference operator.

Properties 

It can be shown that for :

This can be shown by defining a function  such that:

Differentiating this identity now with respect to  yields:

Applying the logarithm rule we get

By the definition of the -function we write

And so

Setting  we have

Now one can deduce the identity above.

The -function is closely related to the gamma function and the Barnes -function; for natural numbers , we have

More prosaically, one may write

The first values are
1, 4, 108, 27648, 86400000, 4031078400000, 3319766398771200000, ... .

References

External links
 

Gamma and related functions